Ted Bundy: Falling for a Killer is a 2020 American true crime docuseries that premiered on Amazon Prime Video on January 30, 2020. The 5-part miniseries was created and directed by Trish Wood. Many viewers who rated the film praised its emphasis on victims, while some objected to its focus on the feminist movement. The incorporation of feminist critique and social contextualization is akin to that seen in later episodes of the Netflix crime docuseries, The Ripper.

Premise 
Ted Bundy: Falling for a Killer recounts the murders, trials and execution of serial killer Ted Bundy from the perspective of his long-time girlfriend Elizabeth Kendall and her daughter, Molly. The series uses archival footage and photographs as well as interviews with victims who survived his attacks, police, reporters and others involved in the cases.

Episodes

See also 
Extremely Wicked, Shockingly Evil and Vile
Conversations with a Killer: The Ted Bundy Tapes

References

External links 
 
 

Amazon Prime Video original programming
English-language television shows
2020 American television series debuts
2020 American television series endings
2020s American documentary television series
Cultural depictions of Ted Bundy
Documentary television series about crime in the United States
Television series by Amazon Studios